Yiliang "Peter" Peng, better known as Doublelift, is an American content creator, streamer, and professional League of Legends player, currently AD Carry for 100 Thieves. He previously played for Counter Logic Gaming, Team Liquid and Team SoloMid. Peng is considered one of the most iconic League of Legends players of all time. He is known for being a fierce competitor and trash-talking his opponents. One of his most famous statements came in 2013 at the League of Legends All-Star tournament when he claimed that, "Everyone else is trash."

Career
Peng comes from California, and started playing console games before jumping to PC titles such as DotA, World of Warcraft, and Heroes of Newerth, eventually moving to League of Legends. In an interview with Machinima in 2013, Peng said his relationship with his parents was strained, because of his dream of being a professional esports player. "I would always struggle with my parents... we would just argue over everything, especially games. When I wanted to play they thought it was just a complete waste of time. It got worse and worse over the years." Peng first entered professional League of Legends when he gained the attention of George "HotshotGG" Georgallidis, founder of Counter Logic Gaming (CLG), who recruited him as a substitute Support player. Shortly after, Peng left CLG to become the starting Support for Epik Gamer. He later joined UnRestricted as the starting AD Carry, and the team was acquired by Team Curse later that year.

Peng's first major tournament was DreamHack Summer 2011, also known as the Riot Season 1 Championship. Hosted in Sweden, he needed his parents' permission to go, but at the time his beginning esports career was a secret to his parents. "They wouldn't let me go... They were like 'You're going to die if you go to Sweden for Dreamhack'. " He was ultimately allowed to go after Doublelift's older brother helped convince their parents.

Peng was timid and socially awkward around his teammates. "I was really awkward and really introverted at the time. I was just that typical Asian guy who does nothing but play games. When I finally met my team I was like 'hi' and that was like the only thing I said. I said nothing after that. I was just a presence with them but I didn't interact with them very much." In a Reddit AMA, Peng said he owed it to Epik Gamer for giving him the opportunity to begin his career. "Without Epik Gamer, I would have never made it into the pro scene most likely."

When Peng returned home, he said his parents were not proud of his accomplishment at Dreamhack. "They wanted me to go to college." Tensions grew between him and his parents over his choice of career, until in 2011 his parents told him to leave the house. He did, taking his prize money from Dreamhack and his computer. Peng wrote about the event on Reddit in a thread titled "Hi I'm Doublelift, formerly of team [Epik Gamer], and today I became homeless." With no college degree or family to return to, he decided to go all-in on his professional gaming career. Peng began earning money for writing educational League of Legends content for Team Curse. "I pretty much made half the guides for that site... I was just super happy and I could finally pay rent that month."

2012 
CLG prime would attend the 2012 MLG Fall Championship in Dallas on November 2 through 4th. In the first round they faced the Korean powerhouse NaJin Sword, where they were routed in two lopsided matches. Falling to the losers bracket, CLG Prime would sweep Curse Gaming in round one, and then pick up a close 2–1 series against another NA team Dignitas. They faced their sister team CLG EU in Round 3 and lost 2–1 and were eliminated from the tournament. CLG Prime finished in 4th with $2,500 in winnings.

2013 
On February 27, 2013, CLG participated in the Riot Season 3 North American League Championship Series Spring Split.

2014 
In 2014, Peng and CLG finished third and fifth, respectively in the spring and summer playoffs, and did not qualify for international events.

2015 
CLG and Peng were fined on January 6, 2015, after being found guilty of poaching ZionSpartan. CLG was fined $2,000 while Peng was fined $2,500. Furthermore, CLG was restricted from fielding ZionSpartan as a player or coach for the first week of the 2015 LCS Spring Split.

For the first eight weeks of the spring split, CLG was never lower in the standings than tied for second place. In the end, they lost a second-place tiebreaker to Cloud9 and so ended up in third place in the regular season. Ultimately, CLG lost to Team Liquid in the quarterfinals and ended the split tied for fifth place with Gravity Gaming.

Peng was benched during the Summer LCS due to an injury incurred from playing basketball.

In August Peng helped CLG win their first-ever LCS Split playoff title. The victory also qualified them for the 2015 League of Legends World Championship. At Worlds CLG failed to make the bracket and finished 12/13th. On October 31, CLG informed Peng that they were not going to re-sign him.

2016 
After CLG released a statement, Team SoloMid announced that Peng would be joining, replacing long tenured AD Carry WildTurtle. On his new team, Peng reached the finals of the spring split, and faced off against his old team, Counter Logic Gaming. TSM fell 3–2 to CLG, and took a second place finish, missing out on the Mid-Season Invitational. In summer, Team SoloMid added a new support to pair with Peng in the botlane, picking up Vincent "Biofrost" Wang. The team saw significant improvement in the summer split, improving their previous 9–9 record to a 17–1 standing at the end of the regular season, and earned a bye into playoffs. Peng also earned First Team All–Pro honors for his performance. Peng once again made it to the finals, and this time won, defeating Cloud9 3–1, to give Peng his second title.

2017 
Before the start of the 2017 season, Team SoloMid announced that Peng would be taking a hiatus from professional League of Legends during the spring split, saying "it's time for a small break." While he would remain contracted to the team, he would be streaming full-time until his return to professional play in the summer when, according to Team SoloMid owner Andy Dinh, he would have to compete with his replacement to return to the starting roster. In the past, Peng has spoken out about the never-ending competitive schedule for professional League of Legends. After representing North America in the All-Star 2013 in Shanghai, Peng said in a Reddit AMA "I'm just tired of playing all day every day, and I want a goddamn break but it's not possible to get one." In a Reddit AMA in 2014, Peng said "Most people who look at pros think that we live the dream life when in reality you either practice 16 hours a day or lose and end up frustrated. Sometimes you practice 16 hours a day and still end up losing." One month later, Team SoloMid announced that WildTurtle would be Peng's replacement for the 2017 spring split. In an interview, teammate Bjergsen agreed with Dinh's initial announcement that Peng would need to compete with his replacement, saying "I want WildTurtle to succeed and I wasn't just sitting around waiting for Peter because I wanted someone who was committed, and like I said I was disappointed and I felt he wasn't very committed. I didn't feel like he should just have the luxury of going out and making a lot of money [streaming] and returning to the team... No matter how good of a friend they are to me, if someone decides he's just going to take six months off and he thinks he's can just reenter the team, that's just not okay with me because I think everyone has to earn their spot."

More than halfway through the spring season and threatened by relegation, Team Liquid announced that Peng would temporarily be joining the team and would be released back to Team SoloMid at the end of the spring split, sparking controversy due to concerns of a conflict of interest when Peng inevitably competed against Team SoloMid while signed to Team Liquid. Team Liquid owner Steve Arhancet responded that Riot Games approved the trade after the team demonstrated that no other player in that role would be suitable for the team.

2018 
Before the start of the 2018 NA LCS season, Team SoloMid announced they would be parting ways with Peng, citing a desire for a stronger shot-caller in the bottom lane. On the same day, Team Liquid announced Peng would be returning along with his ex-Counter Logic Gaming teammates Xmithie and Pobelter. The team finished 4th place in the Spring Split regular season, securing a spot in the playoffs with a 12–8 record behind his former team TSM. Team Liquid defeated Cloud9 3–0 in the quarterfinals and Echo Fox 3–1 in the semifinals to make it to the Team Liquid's first ever final.

A week before the final, Peng learned that his mother Wei Ping Shen was killed and his father Guojon Peng seriously injured after his older brother Yihong Peng allegedly stabbed them in their family home in San Juan Capistrano California. Peng posted on Twitlonger "I'm still processing this news and joining up with my dad and little brother to make sure they're ok and the proper arrangements are being made. I'll likely be quiet on social media while I work through this. I hope you all understand and support me as you always have in the past." In an interview with Machinima in 2013, Peng had said his older brother was the biggest influence on his life and career, and that he had regrets over his falling out with his parents and wished to make amends in the future, but with his busy career "right now I can't do that, I'm too busy." Despite the pressure faced during this event, Steve Arhancet, owner and co-CEO of Team Liquid, announced that Doublelift would not be taking time off and was determined to play in the final as planned. In the final, Team Liquid convincingly defeated 100 Thieves 3–0 and won its first league championship.

In the summer split of 2018, Doublelift and Team Liquid picked up where they left off in spring. A tightly contested regular season saw Team Liquid come out with the number one seed by only a single game over Cloud9, qualifying them for a bye in the first round and a guaranteed spot in the semi-finals. Matched up against 100 Thieves, Doublelift and Team liquid cruised to a 3–1 series victory to move on to a spot in the finals against Cloud9. On the eve of the NA LCS finals, Doublelift was awarded a long-awaited NA LCS MVP for the summer split. This was his first MVP award. Team Liquid easily defeated Cloud9 3–0 in the finals to capture back to back North American LCS titles and looked towards a strong showing at Worlds 2018. However, they were eliminated in the group stage by KT Rolster and Edward Gaming.

2019 
After their group stage exit at Worlds 2018, Team Liquid announced the signings of Jensen and former world champion CoreJJ to the mid lane and support positions respectively. With their newly revamped roster, Team Liquid finished 14–4 on the 2019 Spring Split advancing to the Spring finals to face Doublelift's former team TSM. Team Liquid dropped the first two games of the series, but won the final three games to reverse sweep TSM in the best of 5 series, thus earning Doublelift his 6th championship and 3rd straight title.

Despite coming off of a strong performance in the Spring playoffs, Team Liquid struggled initially in the group stage of MSI 2019, but with a strong finish to the group stage they secured the final spot in the knock–out stage. In the semifinals, the 4th seeded Team Liquid upset the defending world champions, Invictus Gaming, 3–1, and advanced to the finals, where they faced G2 Esports, and were ultimately defeated in a 3–0 sweep.

After MSI, Liquid started out the 2019 LCS Summer Split 2–2, tying them for 4th place. However, by the end of the split, they had once again accrued a 14–4 record, finishing first. In the summer playoffs, Team Liquid beat Clutch Gaming 3–2, and secured a spot at the 2019 League of Legends World Championship. They advanced to the summer finals where they met the second seeded Cloud9. TL won the first game of the series, then dropped games 2 and 3, before winning the final two games to secure their 4th straight LCS trophy. This was Doublelift his 7th championship overall, and passing Xmithie to become the player with the most Championship titles in LCS history. At Worlds, Team Liquid were drawn into Group D, alongside DAMWON Gaming, Invictus Gaming, and ahq e-Sports Club. They went 3–3, placing third in their group, and were eliminated from the tournament.

2020 
With their premature exit from Worlds, Team Liquid parted ways with their jungler, Xmithie, and signed former Fnatic Jungler, Broxah. Prior to the start of the spring 2020 split, Broxah had visa issues preventing him from joining them for the start of the spring season, and Team Liquid performed very poorly. Midway through the split, Doublelift was benched in favor of Team Liquid Academy ADC Tactical. According to Doublelift, this decision stemmed from his apparent lack of motivation to begin the 2020 spring split. Doublelift publicly apologized to his teammates for his attitude, and promised to work harder to return to the LCS stage. Doublelift returned to the starting lineup the following week, but ultimately Liquid finished the split in 9th place and did not make 2020 Spring Playoffs. Doublelift and Team Liquid's failure to qualify for playoffs marked the first time in LCS history that the reigning champion not qualify for the following split's playoffs.

With a disappointing finish to Spring 2020, Team Liquid traded Doublelift to Team SoloMid for the 2020 Summer Split.

With his new team, Peng and TSM had a shaky start to the first half of the split, with a record of 6–3. Although they were third in LCS, critics deemed their wins unconvincing and some considered their record as not properly reflective of their actual skill level. In the middle of the split, Biofrost was replaced by TSM Academy support Treatz, with the team citing better communication and playmaking as the deciding factors.  TSM finished the regular split in 4th place with a 12–6 record and qualified for playoffs. In playoffs, TSM faced the fifth-seeded Golden Guardians in the upper bracket of the double-elimination tournament. Although it was projected to be a close series, Golden Guardians unexpectedly swept TSM 3–0 with the TSM bot lane being perceived as the weak link in the loss. After the first-round defeat, the team subbed Biofrost back in place of Treatz. The move was in part cited to the existing synergy between Doublelift and Biofrost, especially for laning phase. TSM would drop to the bottom half of the elimination bracket to face the 8th seed, Team Dignitas. TSM swept Dignitas in a convincing fashion, as expected. With the Golden Guardians' loss to Team Liquid, TSM had to face them once again in the 2nd round of the lower bracket. Golden Guardians took the first two games of the series, but behind outstanding performances from Bjergsen, Spica, and Brokenblade, TSM managed to come back and reverse sweep the series. In the next round, TSM faced Cloud9 in order to determine the final seed for the 2020 World Championships. TSM won the series against Cloud9 3–1 and qualified for Worlds. With Team Liquid losing to FlyQuest in the upper bracket, Doublelift faced his old team in order to move on to the summer split finals. TSM defeated Team Liquid 3–2 after a grueling five-game series. Critics cited improved play by Doublelift as one of the main reasons behind the win. TSM faced FlyQuest in the finals, with TSM once again winning 3–2 after a tough five-game series. This win marked Doublelift's 8th NA LCS title.

Successfully completing their miraculous lower bracket run, Doublelift and TSM headed to Shanghai for the 2020 World Championships as the NA 1st seed. During the tournament, TSM was placed into Group C along with the LCK 3rd seed Gen.G, the LEC 2nd seed FNC, and the LPL 4th seed LGD. Doublelift was once again unable to advance past the group stage, after TSM went 0–6 in the group stage.

In November 2020, Doublelift announced on his Twitter account that he was retiring from professional League of Legends, thus concluding a storied career which spanned nearly a decade.

2021 
On March 11, 2021, TSM announced on their Twitter that Peng was returning to the organization as a full-time content creator and streamer. Several months after his retirement, Peng revealed a significant reason he walked away from the pro scene was due to discontent with Team SoloMid, even going so far as to say "I fucking hate TSM" as well as accusing the owner, Reginald, of abuse, and left the organization entirely in November.

2022 
In December 2022, Doublelift announced his return to professional play, signing a contract with 100 Thieves for the 2023 season.

Personal life
Peng was born on July 19, 1993, and grew up in Mission Viejo, California. He has a younger and an older brother. In April 2018, his older brother killed their mother and injured their father after an altercation outside of their family's home.

Peng is close friends with esports journalist Travis Gafford. In an interview with Team Dignitas, Gafford said they first met when Peng posted on Reddit that he was homeless and Gafford offered for him to live on his couch until he had money to pay rent. Peng said "Travis really helped me grow up as a person because when I'm playing games and focusing on my job you don't have basic social skills or an understanding of the world. When I go outside I'm like 'how much money am I supposed to spend on food? How do I do my taxes? How do I get a bank account?' I didn't have a credit card, all I had was my wallet with cash and a PayPal account. He helped me set up a bank account, he helped me set up my life."

Tournament results

Awards and nominations

Notes

References

External links
 Twitter account

1993 births
Living people
American people of Chinese descent
People from Mission Viejo, California
People from Los Angeles
Team SoloMid players
Team Liquid players
Counter Logic Gaming players
American esports players
League of Legends AD Carry players
Epik Gamer players
Twitch (service) streamers